This is an alphabetical list of cricketers who have played for The Blaze since their founding in 2020. They first played in the Rachael Heyhoe Flint Trophy, a 50 over competition that began in 2020, in which the team was known as Lightning. In 2021, the Twenty20 Charlotte Edwards Cup was added to the women's domestic structure in England. Ahead of the 2023 season, the team changed its name to The Blaze.

Players' names are followed by the years in which they were active as a The Blaze player. Seasons given are first and last seasons; the player did not necessarily play in all the intervening seasons. Current players are shown as active to the latest season in which they played for the club. This list only includes players who appeared in at least one match for The Blaze; players who were named in the team's squad for a season but did not play a match are not included.

B
 Grace Ballinger (2020–2022)
 Tammy Beaumont (2020–2022)
 Georgie Boyce (2022)
 Kathryn Bryce (2020–2022)
 Sarah Bryce (2020–2022)

C
 Ella Claridge (2021–2022)
 Piepa Cleary (2022)

D
 Gwenan Davies (2022)

E
 Bethan Ellis (2020–2022)

F
 Ria Fackrell (2020)
 Abigail Freeborn (2020–2021)

G
 Kirstie Gordon (2020–2022)
 Teresa Graves (2020–2022)
 Yvonne Graves (2021)
 Josie Groves (2021–2022)

H
 Nancy Harman (2020–2021)
 Bethany Harmer (2021–2022)
 Lucy Higham (2020–2022)

K
 Leah Kellogg (2020)
 Marie Kelly (2022)
 Michaela Kirk (2021–2022)

M
 Sophie Munro (2020–2022)

O
 Sonia Odedra (2021)

P
 Shachi Pai (2020–2021)
 Alicia Presland (2020–2022)

S
 Ilenia Sims (2020)

W
 Emily Windsor (2022)

Captains

See also
 List of Loughborough Lightning cricketers

References

The Blaze (women's cricket)

Lists of women cricketers